The Seagull is a ballet in two acts by Rodion Shchedrin based on the 1896  play The Seagull of Anton Chekhov. The authors of the libretto: Rodion Shchedrin and Valery Levental.

Creation time: 1980.

Premiere: 27 May 1980, Bolshoi theatre, Moscow.

Choreographer: Maya Plisetskaya.

References

Ballets premiered at the Bolshoi Theatre
1980 ballet premieres
Compositions by Rodion Shchedrin